Marcus Wedau (born 31 December 1975) is a German former professional footballer who played as a midfielder.

International career
Wedau made 12 appearances for the Germany U21 national team scoring three goals.

External links

Marcus Wedau Interview
Incarnation down under

Living people
1975 births
People from Heidekreis
Association football midfielders
Footballers from Lower Saxony
German footballers
Germany under-21 international footballers
Germany youth international footballers
Bundesliga players
2. Bundesliga players
A-League Men players
KFC Uerdingen 05 players
MSV Duisburg players
Rot Weiss Ahlen players
Rot-Weiss Essen players
VfL Osnabrück players
Brisbane Roar FC players
German expatriate footballers
German expatriate sportspeople in Australia
Expatriate soccer players in Australia